Talbot School of Theology is an evangelical Christian theological seminary located near Los Angeles. Talbot is one of the nine schools that comprise Biola University, located in La Mirada, California. Talbot is nondenominational and known for its  conservative theological positions, particularly its historical adherence to biblical inerrancy.

History
In 1952, during the last year of his second term as Biola's president, Louis Talbot worked to establish a fully accredited theological seminary. The seminary's first dean was Charles L. Feinberg, who, along with his colleagues, unanimously voted to name the seminary "Talbot Theological Seminary." In 1981, the seminary's name was changed to "Talbot School of Theology" when Biola moved from college to university status.

Talbot is known for its conservative theology, especially related to the doctrine of biblical inerrancy and premillennial eschatology.

Academics
Talbot first became accredited in 1978 by Association of Theological Schools in the United States and Canada.
Talbot has more than 1,200 students, 70 full-time faculty members, 50 part-time faculty, and offers six master's degrees and three doctoral degrees. Clinton E. Arnold is Talbot's sixth and current dean, serving since 2012.

Notable alumni
 Neil T. Anderson – Founder of Freedom in Christ ministry, best-selling author, well-known conference speaker.
 Kenton Beshore – Senior Pastor, Mariners Church in Irvine, California, currently the 17th largest church in the United States and 2nd largest in California 
 Michael Chang – Former professional tennis player from the United States.
 Clyde Cook - Former president of Biola University
F. David Farnell – Former Professor of New Testament at The Master's Seminary and Director of the Redeemer Center for Church Leadership
 R. Kent Hughes – Editor and contributor, Preaching the Word commentary series, Senior Pastor Emeritus, College Church, Wheaton, Illinois
 Greg Koukl – Christian speaker, radio talk show host, apologist, and president of Stand to Reason ministries.
 Andy Luckey – producer for the 80s and 90s series Teenage Mutant Ninja Turtles and Adventures from the Book of Virtues
 John F. MacArthur – Evangelical writer, pastor, and chancellor of The Master's University and The Master's Seminary
 Josh McDowell – Christian author and pastor
 Frank Pastore – Christian radio host The Frank Pastore Show, KKLA 99.5 FM
 Danny Yamashiro – Chaplain at Massachusetts Institute of Technology (MIT), researcher on American presidents and childhood trauma, and media talk show host
 David Alan Black - Professor of New Testament and Greek at Southeastern Baptist Theological Seminary
 Mark L. Strauss - Professor of New Testament at Bethel Seminary San Diego

Notable faculty
 Clinton E. Arnold – Talbot Dean, former president of the Evangelical Theological Society.
 William Lane Craig – Research Professor of Philosophy, author, and Christian apologist.
 Michael J. Wilkins - Distinguished Professor of New Testament Language and Literature, author and lecturer.
 J. P. Moreland – Distinguished Professor of Philosophy, author, and lecturer.
 Scott B. Rae – Dean of Faculty, Professor of Christian Ethics, former president of Evangelical Theological Society
 Robert L. Saucy – Distinguished Professor of Systematic Theology, author and former president of the Evangelical Theological Society.
 Gregory Ganssle – Professor of Philosophy, lecturer, author, a former senior fellow and lecturer at Rivendell Institute, Yale University, 
 Douglas Geivett – Professor of Philosophy, lecturer, author, and former chair of Talbot Department of Philosophy, former president of the Evangelical Philosophical Society.

New Talbot Complex

The Talbot Building Complex Project is a $55.4 million project that will take place in two phases over the course of several years. Prior to completion of Phase One, existing Talbot facilities, which had been designed for 300 graduate students, were serving 1,000 students in massively overcrowded conditions. When completed, the buildings are designed to form a seminary "campus within a campus."

Phase One added a new  building adjacent to Feinberg Hall, named Talbot East.  This $21.4 million project added 7 classrooms, 31 academic offices, and features a faculty meeting room, prayer chapel, two conference rooms, and a Ph.D. seminar room. On May 20, 2010, Biola officials held a ground breaking ceremony for Phase One and it was officially dedicated on October 14, 2011.

Phase Two will demolish Myers Hall, which is nearly 50 years old, and replace it with a state-of-the-art  building, providing 17 classrooms, 53 academic offices, a theology reading room, a student lounge/cafe', and a recreation room.  Rooftop gardens will help decrease the amount of energy required to heat and cool the building.  Phase Two will also remodel the first floor of Feinberg Hall to accommodate the Institute for Spiritual Formation.

See also
 Biola University

References

External links
 

Educational institutions established in 1952
Biola University
Evangelical seminaries and theological colleges in the United States
Seminaries and theological colleges in California
1952 establishments in California